Christine Colombo Nilsen (married Hajo, born 30 April 1982) is a retired Norwegian football goalkeeper. She currently (2012) plays for Vålerenga in the Toppserien. She is also a member of the Norway women's national football team.

She has appeared nine times for the national team since her debut on March 11, 2006 in a match against Finland. She was a member of the 2007 Women's World Cup squad.

On June 9, 2008 Nilsen was named to the Norwegian roster for the 2008 Summer Olympics to be held in Beijing, China.

In autumn 2009 Nilsen joined French champions Olympique Lyonnais where she stood in goal for several rounds of the UEFA Women's Champions League, which OL won in 2010 by beating Turbine Potsdam in the Final.

Nilsen left Olympique Lyonnais in July 2010 and returned to Norway to work as a hairdresser with no plans to continue in football.  But she was persuaded to stand in goal for Arna-Bjørnar for a few games in the autumn while Erika Skarbø was injured, and was also a member of the Norway national squad that in September qualified for the 2011 World Cup.  In autumn 2011 she played a further two matches for Arna-Bjørnar.  In January 2012 she joined the newly promoted Toppserien club Vålerenga, trained by her former Kolbotn teammates Cecilie Berg-Hansen and Solveig Gulbrandsen.  Her new contract allows her flexibility to continue working outside football.  She was member of Norway's squad at the 2012 Algarve Cup.

References

External links
Official Kolbotn club site
FootballMagasinet.no profile

1982 births
Living people
People from Akershus
Norwegian women's footballers
Norway women's youth international footballers
Norway women's international footballers
Women's association football goalkeepers
Athene Moss players
Arna-Bjørnar players
Olympique Lyonnais Féminin players
Kolbotn Fotball players
Vålerenga Fotball Damer players
Footballers at the 2008 Summer Olympics
Olympic footballers of Norway
Norwegian expatriate women's footballers
Expatriate women's footballers in France
Norwegian expatriate sportspeople in France
2007 FIFA Women's World Cup players
Division 1 Féminine players
Sportspeople from Viken (county)